Katul Rural District is a rural district (dehestan) in the Central District of Aliabad County, Golestan Province, Iran. At the 2006 census, its population was 33,729, in 7,762 families.  The rural district has 31 villages.

References 

Rural Districts of Golestan Province
Aliabad County